James or Jim Wolf, Wolfe or DeWolf may refer to:

 James DeWolf (1764–1837), American politician, privateer, and slave trader
 James Madison DeWolf (1843–1876), U.S. Army surgeon
 James Ratchford DeWolf, merchant and political figure in Nova Scotia
 James Wolfe (1727–1759), British general
 James Wolffe (born 1962), Scottish lawyer
 Jim Wolf (born 1969), Major League Baseball umpire
 Jim Wolf (musician), American singer
 Jim Wolf (American football) (1952–2003), American football player
 James A. Wolfe, former Security Director of the U.S. Senate Select Intelligence Committee (SSCI)